Wolton or Woolton is an English toponymic surname, deriving from a place name (Woolton) in Kent or Lancashire. People with the name include:

 Althea Wolton (née Willoughby, 1904–1982), British artist 
 Bert Wolton (1929 – 1990), English cricketer
  (b. 1947), French sociologist
 Douglas Wolton (1898 – 1988), British communist activist
 Georgie Wolton, (born 1934), British architect
  (born 1951), French journalist and essayist
 John Woolton (1535?–1594), Bishop of Exeter

See also 
 Earl of Woolton, a title in the Peerage of the United Kingdom
 Wolton (disambiguation)

References